St Joseph's Fairview, sometimes St Joseph's C.B.S., and previously St Joseph's Secondary Christian Brothers' School, is a boys' secondary school in Fairview, Dublin, Ireland. The school was in the patronage of the Irish Christian Brothers and the patron is now the Edmund Rice Schools Trust.

History

Early years
St Joseph's Christian Brothers' School, Fairview was founded in 1888. It was originally a training school where Christian Brothers learned to teach before moving on to other schools. At this time, it contained only three classrooms and taught junior classes.  In 1890, one of the classes was given over to Intermediate Cert level. Br. J.M. Costen became the first headmaster of the school.

By 1906, two extensions led to the original building having two storeys, including a woodwork room and a chemistry lab.  At least seventeen past pupils of the school participated in the 1916 Rising.

1930 to 1990
Despite the addition of partitions to classrooms in 1935 and the first extension in forty years in 1946 to the original building, numbers of pupils continued to rise. It was decided in the mid-fifties that a new second-level school building was required - this was completed in 1958. The primary school then occupied the original building.

In 1938, Br. T.M. Ó'Catháin arrived at the school and he established the Leaving Certificate. The first Leaving Cert Class graduated in 1942.

The Past Pupils' Union was established in 1956, with attendants of the first dinner including Harry Boland, Br. A.P. Caombhánach and Br. Ó'Catháin.

By 1957, Irish was no longer the only language used to teach in the school and English was used for certain subjects. A new primary school building was constructed in 1964 and blessed by Archbishop McQuaid in 1965. The two other buildings were used by the secondary school, which arrangement continues to the present.

In 1966, the school celebrated the 50th Anniversary of the 1916 Rising. Br. Caombhánach oversaw the production of a souvenir publication and research into the former pupils who took part in the Rising.

In 1986, the first lay principal, Mr. Michael Foster, was appointed. Two years later, the school celebrated its centenary by producing an anniversary yearbook (under the direction of Mr. Seamus McGann).

1990 to present
A Repeat Leaving Certificate Programme was introduced in 1996 to tackle declining student numbers. From 1998, permission was received to accept girls in the Repeat Programme.

In 2013, St Joseph's celebrated its 125th Anniversary by producing an anniversary yearbook, officially opening new classrooms, launching a new website and launching a fund for a new development.

As of 2019, the school had an enrollment of approximately 300.

In 2022, the school received sanction from the Edmund Rice Schools Trust and Department of Education to enrol female students in the 2023/24 academic years. As such the school status will change on this date from ‘all-boys’ to co-educational.

Notable alumni

Notable faculty
Cyril Farrell, hurling manager 
Albert Folens, educational publisher
Bro. Thomas Munchin Keane, teacher and mathematician, wrote the first textbook for the new leaving certificate mathematics in Irish in the 1960s.

Sources
Gerard Brockie, (Dublin, 1998). St. Joseph's C.B.S., Fairview 1888 - 1988.

References

External links
Official site 
Alumni site

Boys' schools in the Republic of Ireland
Secondary schools in County Dublin
Secondary schools in Dublin (city)
1888 establishments in Ireland
Educational institutions established in 1888
Congregation of Christian Brothers secondary schools in the Republic of Ireland